Vamakan (also Romanized as Vamakān and Vamkān) is a village in Olya Rural District, in the Central District of Ardestan County, Isfahan Province, Iran. At the 2006 census, its population was 85, in 29 families.

References 

Populated places in Ardestan County